The Stork enamine alkylation involves the addition of an enamine to a Michael acceptor (e.g., an α,β -unsaturated carbonyl compound) or another electrophilic alkylation reagent to give an alkylated iminium product, which is hydrolyzed by dilute aqueous acid to give the alkylated ketone or aldehyde. Since enamines are generally produced from ketones or aldehydes, this overall process (known as the Stork enamine synthesis) constitutes a selective monoalkylation of a ketone or aldehyde, a process that may be difficult to achieve directly.

The Stork enamine synthesis:

 formation of an enamine from a ketone
 addition of the enamine to an alpha, beta-unsaturated aldehyde or ketone
 hydrolysis of the enamine back to a ketone

The reaction also applies to acyl halides as electrophiles, which results in the formation of 1,3-diketones (Stork acylation).

It is also effective for activated sp3 alkyl electrophiles, including benzylic, allylic/propargylic, α-carbonyl (e.g., bromoacetone), and α-alkoxy (e.g., methoxymethyl chloride) alkyl halides.  However, nonactivated alkyl halides, including methyl and other primary alkyl halides, generally only give low to moderate yields of the desired alkylation product (see below).

The reaction is named after its inventor, Gilbert Stork (Columbia University).

Variations
By using an anionic version of an enamine, known as an azaenolate or metalloenamine, it is also possible to alkylate ketones or aldehydes with alkyl halides as less reactive electrophiles:

In this method a carbonyl compound is converted to an imine by alkylimino-de-oxo-bisubstitution with a primary amine. The imine is then reacted with a Grignard reagent to the corresponding magnesium azaenolate.  By virtue of the negative charge of this species, it is capable of displacing a halide from less reactive alkyl halides, including methyl, ethyl, and other nonactivated halides. Hydrolysis once again yields the alkylated ketone.

References

Carbon-carbon bond forming reactions
Name reactions
Enamines